David Simon Berwick Broza (born September 4, 1955) is an Israeli singer-songwriter. His music mixes modern pop with Spanish music.

Biography
David Broza was born in Haifa, Israel. His father was an Israeli–British businessman of German-Dutch Jewish descent. He grew up in England and Spain, attending Runnymede College, in Madrid. Broza's grandfather, Wellesley Aron, co-founded the Arab-Israeli peace settlement Neve Shalom – Wāħat as-Salām (The Oasis of Peace) and the Habonim youth movement. Young David Broza originally planned to become a graphic artist, and by age 17 he was selling his paintings in the Rastro, Madrid's Sunday flea market. Following high school, and while serving in the Israel Defense Forces, he began playing guitar in cafes to earn extra money. Eventually he was offered a record deal, but as he still hoped to attend the Rhode Island School of Design, he declined. He later recorded a tape to promote his live shows.

Broza was married to Ruti Gabison, from whom he is divorced. He has three children. He lived in Cresskill, New Jersey, United States for 17 years. He resides in Tel Aviv and is a member of Kehilat Sinai, a Conservative synagogue.

Music career
His music reflects a fusion of the three countries in which he was raised:  Israel, Spain and England. Since 1977, when his hit song “Yihye Tov” (It'll be Good) first hit the airwaves, David Broza has been working to promote a message of peace. In 2013, Broza began work on a new project – bringing together Israeli and Palestinian musicians for 8 days and nights to work side by side in an East Jerusalem recording studio.  The result was East Jerusalem West Jerusalem, a collection of thirteen songs that blends cultures, languages and styles into a powerful statement about collaboration and coexistence.  The album, produced by Steve Earle, features a stirring duet with Wyclef Jean.

In 2007, a concert at Masada featured Broza with special guests Jackson Browne and Shawn Colvin.  David Broza appeared as a guest and shared the bill with Paul Simon, Bob Dylan, Van Morrison and others.

In 2022, Broza began singing at Temple Emanuel in New York City on Friday nights. The service consists of 14 prayers set to music by Broza with a back up of 27 musicians and a choir.Broza wrote the 14 melodies in 14 days and turned them into an album, Tefila.

Musical collaboration
In 1994, David Broza performed with Texan singer-songwriter Townes Van Zandt during a Writers in the Round concert in Houston. They never met or had any further contact thereafter, and yet, when Van Zandt died three years later, he left Broza a shoe box full of unreleased poems and lyrics with a request that Broza set them to music. Years later, the result of that unusual story was the album "Night Dawn: The Unpublished Poetry of Townes Van Zandt", which was released by Broza in 2010.

In 2007, David Broza performed at his annual Sunrise at Masada concert in Israel where Broza collaborated with Shawn Colvin and Jackson Browne. The concert was filmed as part of a PBS special and was released in 2014 on DVD and CD by Magenta Label Group.

In early 2013, Broza recorded sessions at Sabreen Studios in East Jerusalem with a band composed of both Israeli and Palestinian musicians, including Mira Awad, Shaa'nan Streett of Hadag Nahash, West Bank rap duo G-Town and Wyclef Jean. The resulting album, "East Jerusalem/West Jerusalem," produced by Steve Earle and Steve Greenberg, was released in early 2014 on S-Curve Records.

Peace activism
Broza was appointed a goodwill ambassador for UNICEF. His song "Together" (co-written with Ramsey McLean) was the theme song for the UNICEF 50th anniversary celebration in more than 148 countries.

Discography 
The Long Road (Single) (English, 2016)
We Are All Alike (All Tears Are Alike) (Single) (Hebrew, 2016)
Andalusian Love Song (Hebrew, 2015)
East Jerusalem / West Jerusalem (English, 2014)
Third Language (Hebrew, 2011)
Night Dawn: The Unpublished Poetry Of Townes Van Zandt (English, 2010)
At Masada: The Sunrise Concert featuring Shawn Colvin & Jackson Browne (English, 2007)
Broza 5 (Live at Zappa Tel Aviv, 2007)
Things Will Be Better: The Best of David Broza (JMG, 2006)
Parking Completo (Spanish and Hebrew, 2006)
Hameitav (Best Of in Hebrew, 2004)
Parking Completo (Spanish, 2004)
Todo O Nada (Spanish version of All or Nothing, 2002)
All Or Nothing (Hebrew, 2002)
Painted Postcard (English & Hebrew, 2002)
Spanish Heart (English, 2001)
Isla Mujeres (The Women's Island), DRO East West/Warner Records Spain  (Spanish, 2000)
Matchil Linshom (Starting to Breathe), Hed Artzi/RGB Records Gold (Hebrew, 1999)
Sodot Gdolim (Big Secrets), RGB Records (Hebrew, 1995)
Stone Doors, RGB Records (English, 1994)
Second Street, RGB Records (English, 1994)
Elements of Love, RGB Records (Hebrew, 1994)
Masada Live, RGB Records Platinum (Hebrew, 1994)
Time of Trains, RGB Records (English, 1993)
Neshika Gnuva (Stolen Kiss), NMC Music (Hebrew, 1991)
First Collection, NMC Music (Hebrew, 1990)
Away From Home, RGB Records (English, 1989)
Poets in New York (Poetas en Nueva York) (contributor, Federico García Lorca tribute album, 1986)
Broza, NMC Music (Hebrew, 1984)
Haisha Sheiti (The Woman by My Side), NMC Music Quadruple Platinum (Hebrew, 1983)
Klaf (ACE), NMC Music (Hebrew, 1981)
David Broza, NMC Music (Hebrew, 1979)
Hakeves Ha Shisha Asar (The Sixteenth Sheep), NMC Music (Hebrew, 1978)
Sikhot Salon (Small Talk), Phohokol (Hebrew, 1977)

See also
Israeli music

References

External links
 Official website
 British Friends of Neve Shalom 
 David Broza at aviv2.com
 American Friends of Neve Shalom/Wahat al-Salam
 David Broza: Making the Music the Poem Wants
 David Broza's recording of 'V'ulai' for Pioneers for a Cure

1955 births
Living people
Flamenco
Folk rock musicians
Israeli activists
Israeli folk singers
Israeli guitarists
21st-century Israeli male singers
Israeli people of British-Jewish descent
Israeli people of Dutch-Jewish descent
20th-century Israeli male singers
Jewish singers
Singers from New Jersey
People from Cresskill, New Jersey
People from Haifa
Israeli Sephardi Jews
Spanish-language singers
Israeli male singer-songwriters